A83 or A-83 may refer to:
 A83 motorway (France), a road connecting Nantes and Niort
 A83 road (Scotland), a major road in Scotland